
Guanyin is the Chinese/East Asian version of the bodhisattva Avalokiteśvara.

Guanyin may also refer to:

Places
Guanyin District, Taoyuan, Taiwan
Guanyin Township, Gongcheng County, Guangxi, China
Guanyin Subdistrict, Pengshan District, Meishan, Sichuan, China
Guanyin Creek, a tributary of the Xiang River in Changsha, Hunan, China
Guanyin Bridge, in Lushan, Jiangxi, China
Guanyindong or Guanyin Cave, archaeological site in Qianxi County, Guizhou, China. 
Xuzhou Guanyin International Airport, in Suining County, Jiangsu, China

Towns in China
Guanyin, Hubei, in Yunxi County, Hubei
Guanyin, Shaanxi, in Zhenba County, Shaanxi
Guanyin, Dazhu County, Sichuan
Guanyin, Yibin, Sichuan

People
Shen Wuhua ( 569–626), empress of the Chen dynasty, later became a Buddhist nun named Guanyin
Xiao Guanyin (1040–1075), empress of the Liao dynasty

Others
Pachyosa guanyin, a species of beetle from Taiwan

See also
Mount Guanyin (disambiguation)